PLX or Plx or plx may refer to:

 PLX, or Picatinny Liquid Explosive, a liquid binary explosive
 PLX Technology a former manufacturer of integrated circuits focused on PCI Express and Ethernet
 .plx a file extension used by the computer language perl
 plx symbol for pico lux
 PLX a product of Pen-Link
 PLX "placental expanded cells" a technology of Pluristem Therapeutics
 AMEX and Tase symbols for Protalix BioTherapeutics are PLX
 PLX is the IATA code for Semey Airport
 pLX (vector) a transformation vector

See also
 PLX 1468.2 or 45 Aurigae a binary star system
 PLX-1000 a turntable by Pioneer DJ